George Edward Hunt may refer to:

 George E. Hunt (1896–1959), English cricketer
 George Edward Hunt (jeweller) (1892–1960), Birmingham Arts and Crafts jeweller